Narelle is a given name and surname and may refer to:

People
Marie Narelle, (1870–1941), Australian singer
Narelle Autio, (born 1969), Australian photographer
Narelle Jubelin, (born 1960), Australian artist
Narelle Kellner, (1934–1987), Australian chess player
Narelle Kheng, (born 1993), Chinese-Singaporean musician, actress and swimmer
Narelle Moras, (born 1956), Australian swimmer
Narelle Oliver (1960–2016), Australian artist

Other
Cyclone Narelle, 2013 tropical cyclone
Narelle Smart, fictional character from Home and Away